The Georgia Department of Revenue (GDOR) is the principal tax collection agency in the U.S. state of Georgia. The Department administers tax laws and enforces laws and regulations concerning alcohol and tobacco products in the state. The Georgia Department of Revenue is headquartered in Atlanta, Georgia

Organization 
The Department is led by a Revenue Commissioner and has 964 employees within six divisions and a processing center. The Administrative Division provides administrative services for the department. The Alcohol and Tobacco Division is involved in all aspects regarding alcohol and tobacco sells in the state while the Compliance Division audits tax accounts, enforces compliance with the Public Revenue Code of Georgia, conducts taxpayer education seminars and assists in the collection of taxes. The Department's Local Government Services Division administers property tax laws and oversees much of the local county property tax assessment and collection process. The Processing Center "performs upfront processing for all tax returns received by mail and electronically filed." The Taxpayer Services Division manages taxpayer protests and hearings, administers income tax laws, and administers the Corporate Net Worth Tax.

References

External links 

Taxation in Georgia (U.S. state)
US state tax agencies
Revenue